St James Lutheran College is an independent, co-educational Kindergarten to Year 12 Lutheran College under the Lutheran Church of Australia. The school is located in Urraween, a suburb of Hervey Bay, South East Queensland, Australia. St James Lutheran College currently caters for approximately 800 students, after opening in 2003 as one of the newest Christian schools on the Fraser Coast.

Curriculum

Junior School 
In the Junior School years, St James has a strong focus on the development of sound Literacy and Numeracy skills, taught within the framework of the Australian English and Mathematics Curriculum. Teachers dedicate a significant amount of time each day towards Literacy and Numeracy development. The other core curriculum areas taught in the Junior School are

 Christian Studies
 Science
 Humanities
 Health and Physical Education (HPE)

Integrated as part of these units of work are The Arts and Technology learning areas. Junior School students also engage in a number of specialist subjects each week, including:

 Languages Other Than English (LOTE)
 Japanese
 Music and Dance 
 Drama (MADD)
 Library (Information, research and literature appreciation).

Middle school 
In a students' middle school years, they will develop essential cultural, informational, and social skills. In addition to this, middle school students are also educated on essential components for their senior years to come.

The core curriculum items offered in the Middle School are

 Christian Studies
 English
Mathematics
 Science
 Humanities (History / Geography)
 and Health and Physical Education (HPE)

Middle School students also have the ability to engage in a range of specialist subjects, including:

 Languages Other Than English (LOTE) - Japanese (ongoing for two semesters each year)
 Music and Dance - one semester each year
 Drama (MADD) - one semester each year
 Visual Arts - one semester each year
 Photography - one semester each year
 Media - one semester each year
 Digital Technologies - one semester each year
 Wood Technology (previously known as Manual Arts) - one semester each year
 Food Technology (previously known as Home Economics) - one semester each year

Senior School 
In 2012, St James offered its Senior School curriculum program for the first time. Subject offerings are based on the Australian Curriculum, Assessment and Reporting Authority (ACARA) courses and the Queensland Studies Authority (QSA) syllabus.

Up until 2019, OP (Overall Position) was used as the standard for senior reporting and higher education. However, with the Queensland Curriculum and Assessment Authority (QCAA) introducing the new ATAR curriculum, the OP system was phased out with senior students now studying an improved syllabus.

The following are the current subjects on offer:

**Sciences

 ATAR Biology
 ATAR Chemistry
 ATAR Physics
 ATAR Marine Biology
 ATAR Psychology

Workforce/Applied

 Aquatic Practices
 **Religion and Ethics (R&E)

Humanities

 ATAR Ancient Histories
 ATAR Geography

**English

 Literature
 General English
 Prevocational English

**Mathematics

 Prevocational Mathematics
 General Mathematics
 Mathematical Methods
 Specialist Mathematics

LOTE (Languages Other Than English)

 Japanese.
 French

The Arts

 ATAR Drama
 Drama in Practice
 ATAR Dance
 Dance in Practice
 Visual Arts in Practice
 ATAR Visual Arts

Technologies and Advanced Skills

 Food Technologies (previously known as Home Economics)
 Wood Technologies (previously known as Manual Arts)
 Engineering (previously known as Metal Works)
 Design
 Sport and Recreation (Outdoor Recreation)

**Subjects marked with two asterisks are core subjects or are mandatory for QCE completion

Vocational education and training (VET) is an option for students in Year 10. VET qualifications and options include: Certificate I, Certificate II, Certificate III, Certificate IV, Diploma and Advanced Diploma, and Traineeships and apprenticeships.

Co-curriculum 
There are a variety of extra-curricular activities offered at St James Lutheran
College. Some are weekly and others occur according to the school season.
The most commonly occurring extra-curricular activities include the following:

Musical

 The St James choir which performs at civic and school functions.
 The St James band.

College and Community Involvement

 Participation in the local ANZAC Day march.
 Participation in the University of New South Wales ICAS testing program in English, Writing, Spelling, Maths, Science and Computing.
 Participation in the local Maths Challenge competition.
Participation in local and regional Gardiner Chess tournaments

Student Engagement Clubs

 Fishing Club
 Chess Club
Computer and Coding Club
Visual Art Extension
 Equestrian Activities
 Wildlife Club
 Gardening Club
 Film and Television Club
 Robotics Club
Dance Club

Extra-curricular Opportunities

Live Sound and Audio
Learning Central
International trips such as Japanese exchange program and the Spain Trip

Other activities that occur from time to time according to the school seasons
and interests of students include swimming and athletics training. St James
also participates in local community events such as The Whale Festival and
local shows.

Houses 
St James has three Sports houses, which are named after local waterways on
Fraser Island: Eli, Wabby and McKenzie.
These houses regularly compete in school and sporting-based events, as well as providing a structured and fun way for students to collaborate and build team spirit.

The St James annual carnival program (Cross Country, Athletics, and Swimming) is supported by seasonal sporting carnival days as well such as Netball, Soccer, Cricket, Rugby, AFL, Basketball and Volleyball. As well as trial-based events at these carnivals, the College also offers students the chance to compete for the St. James Cup, the House Spirit Award, the Environmental Award (how well house members respected the grounds during the carnival) and the House Participation Award. Alongside school days, involvement in weekend sport commenced in 2012.

History 
The College began operation in a demountable classroom block consisting
of 4 rooms in 2003 with an enrollment of approximately 70 students. It has since grown to include 10 blocks of classrooms and a Library building, all of which house over 650 students as of 2019.

See also 

List of schools in Queensland

References

External links 
St James Lutheran College (Official)
St James Lutheran Church website
Lutheran Education Australia

Schools in Queensland